Proteoforms are the different forms of a protein produced from the genome with a variety of sequence variations, splice isoforms, and post-translational modifications. Proteoform captures the disparate sources of biological variation which alter primary sequence and composition at the whole-protein level. Protein characterization at the proteoform level has a crucial importance to fully understand biological processes since specific proteoforms can carry particular biological functions. The proteoforms estimation in human can be in millions for around 20,000 proteins.

References 

Protein classification